Novosibirsk-Zapadny is a passenger railway station along the Trans-Siberian Railway. It is located in Leninsky City District of Novosibirsk, Russia.

History
The station was opened in 1896.

Location
Novosibirsk-Zapadny Railway Station is located in Leninsky District between Stantsionnaya and Shirokaya streets.

Gallery

References

External links
 Путеводитель по великой Сибирской железной дороге. От С.-Петербурга до Владивостока. 1909-1910. - Санкт-Петербург, 1909.

Zapadny
Trans-Siberian Railway
Railway stations in the Russian Empire opened in 1896
Leninsky District, Novosibirsk
1896 establishments in the Russian Empire